Wendron was an electoral division of Cornwall in the United Kingdom which returned one member to sit on Cornwall Council from 2009 to 2013. From 2009 until his death in 2011, Mike Clayton represented the division as an Independent. Loveday Jenkin, the former leader of Mebyon Kernow and the runner up in the 2009 election, won the ensuing by-election and represented the division until it was abolished in 2013.

The division covered 7,144 hectares in total. It was abolished by the Cornwall (Electoral Changes) Order 2011, and Jenkin went on to be elected as Councillor for Crowan and Wendron.

Election results

2011 by-election

2009 election

References

Electoral divisions of Cornwall Council